Batala railway station is located in Gurdaspur district in the Indian state of Punjab and serves the industrial town of Batala .

The railway station

History
It originally belonged to the local government and was transferred to North Western Railway in 1892.

Developments

The  Qadian–Beas link was approved in 2011. It would provide direct and shorter access from Batala to Ambala–Attari line.

References

External links
 Trains at Batala

Railway stations in Gurdaspur district
Firozpur railway division